Mehmet Nuri Yamut Pasha (1890, Selanik – 5 June 1961, İstanbul) was a Turkish general, who became the 20th Commander of the Turkish Armed Forces on 5 June 1950. He was a career Artillery officer. In 1943 he was appointed to the 2nd Corps Command in Gallipoli. During the 2nd Corps Command, he sold his house for the Turkish soldiers who were killed in the Battle of Gallipoli, and built a monumental grave. He served as Chief of General Staff between 1950-1954 for a four-year period. It is the first commander-in-chief of the Turkish Land Forces Command since the transition from the Ottoman army to the modern-regular army. He then retired and entered the Parliament from the Justice Party. TBMM X. and XI. He is a deputy in Istanbul.

After May 27 the then-Commander of Turkish Armed Forces Rüştü Erdelhun was assaulted by putschist young officers while the hero of the War of Independence, Ali Fuat Cebesoy and Korean War veteran Tahsin Yazıcı and former Commander Mehmet Nuri Yamut were arrested and imprisoned. While he was a deputy, he was arrested after the May 27 coup d'etat. He then died during the Yassıada Judgments.

References

External links
Chiefs of General Staff , Turkish General Staff.

 

 

1890 births
People from Salonica vilayet
Turkish Army generals
Turkish Military Academy alumni
Army War College (Turkey) alumni
Commanders of the First Army of Turkey
Commanders of the Second Army of Turkey
Commanders of the Turkish Land Forces
Chiefs of the Turkish General Staff
1961 deaths